In enzymology, a 1-alkylglycerophosphocholine O-acyltransferase is an enzyme that catalyzes the chemical reaction

acyl-CoA + 1-alkyl-sn-glycero-3-phosphocholine  CoA + 2-acyl-1-alkyl-sn-glycero-3-phosphocholine

Thus, the two substrates of this enzyme are acyl-CoA and 1-alkyl-sn-glycero-3-phosphocholine, whereas its two products are CoA and 2-acyl-1-alkyl-sn-glycero-3-phosphocholine.

This enzyme belongs to the family of transferases, specifically those acyltransferases transferring groups other than aminoacyl groups.  The systematic name of this enzyme class is acyl-CoA:1-alkyl-sn-glycero-3-phosphocholine O-acyltransferase. This enzyme participates in ether lipid metabolism.

References

 
 

EC 2.3.1
Enzymes of unknown structure